

Orthonama is a genus of the geometer moth family (Geometridae). It belongs to the tribe Xanthorhoini of the "carpet" subfamily (Larentiinae). Nycterosea is usually included here by modern authors, but may in fact be distinct enough to warrant recognition as an independent genus. The genus was erected by Jacob Hübner in 1825.

Selected species
Species of Orthonama (sensu lato) include:
 Orthonama centrostrigaria (Wollaston, 1858) (= O. interruptata, O. latirupta, O. luscinata, O. mediata, O. paranensis)
 Orthonama dicymanta Prout, 1929
 Orthonama discataria
 Orthonama evansi (McDunnough, 1920)
 Orthonama flavillacea
 Orthonama obstipata 	(Fabricius, 1794) – gem
 Orthonama plemyrata
 Orthonama quadrisecta Herbulot, 1954
 Orthonama vittata (Borkhausen, 1794) – oblique carpet

Synonyms
Junior synonyms of Orthonama are:
 Nycterocea (lapsus)
 Nycterosea Hulst, 1896 (but see above)
 Nyctosia (lapsus; non Hampson, 1900: preoccupied)
 Orthonoma (lapsus)
 Percnoptilota Hulst, 1896
 Plemyria Hübner, 1825a (non Hübner, 1825b: preoccupied)

Footnotes

References

  (2009a): Nycterosea. Version 2.6.2, 29 August 2013. Retrieved 12 March 2017.
  (2009b): Orthonama. Version 2.6.2, 29 August 2013. Retrieved 12 March 2017.
  (2004a): Butterflies and Moths of the World, Generic Names and their Type-species – Nycterosea. Version of 5 November 2004. Retrieved 12 May 2010.
  (2004b): Butterflies and Moths of the World, Generic Names and their Type-species – Orthonama. Version of 5 November 2004. Retrieved 12 May 2010.
  (2001): Markku Savela's Lepidoptera and some other life forms – Orthonama. Version of 14 December 2001. Retrieved 12 May 2010.

Xanthorhoini